Boundary Lake is a lake in Tuolumne County, California, in the United States.

Boundary Lake was likely named from its location at the edge of Yosemite National Park.

See also
List of lakes in California

References

Lakes of Tuolumne County, California
Lakes of Yosemite National Park